Stoyan Popov (born 25 July 1917, date of death unknown) was a Bulgarian sports shooter. He competed in the 50 m pistol event at the 1952 Summer Olympics.

References

1917 births
Year of death missing
Bulgarian male sport shooters
Olympic shooters of Bulgaria
Shooters at the 1952 Summer Olympics
Place of birth missing